Céline Sciamma (born 12 November 1978) is a French screenwriter and film director. She is especially known for her films Girlhood (2014), My Life as a Courgette (2016), and Portrait of a Lady on Fire (2019), winning many nominations and awards for her films.

A common theme in Sciamma's films is the fluidity of gender and sexual identity among girls and women, and her films explore the female gaze.

Early life and education
Sciamma was born on 12 November 1978 was raised in Cergy-Pontoise, a suburb outside of Paris. Her father, Dominique Sciamma, is a software designer, and her brother, Laurent Sciamma, is a stand-up performer and graphic designer.

Before attending La Fémis, the première French film school, where she studied from 2001-2005, Sciamma earned her master's degree in French Literature at Paris Nanterre University. As a child, she was an avid reader and became interested in film as a teenager. Sciamma cites her grandmother as inspiration to her love of film, saying that she had a great interest in old Hollywood movies. Sciamma also attended Utopia, an art house cinema theater in Cergy 3 times a week as a teenager. She wrote her first original script for Water Lilies as part of her final evaluation at La Fémis. Sciamma has stated that she never planned on directing, and that she has thought only about screenwriting or working as a critic, because she felt that directing was too much of a ‘male only’ position. Xavier Beauvois, who was chairman of the evaluation panel, and could be considered as her mentor, persuaded her to make the film. A year after finishing school, she began shooting the film in her hometown.

Career

Films
Sciamma's debut film, Water Lilies, was released in 2007. The French title, "Naissance des Pieuvres," translates to "Birth of the Octupuses," but was altered for the international release. The film's script was Sciamma's senior project at La Fémis, although when she wrote it, Sciamma did not intend to direct it. The film, shot in Cergy, France, a Parisian suburb, explores the world of synchronized swimming. Based on Sciamma's own encounter with the sport, the film's protagonist explores her burgeoning sexuality and attraction to the team's captain. Water Lilies was selected for screening in the section Un certain regard at the 2007 Cannes Film Festival. It also won the Louis Delluc award for a first film. The film secured three nominations for the 2008 César Awards; Sciamma was nominated for the César Award for Best Debut, and actresses Adèle Haenel and Louise Blachère were both nominated for the César Award for Most Promising Actress.

Sciamma directed her first short film, Pauline, in 2009 as part of a government anti-homophobia campaign called ‘Five films against homophobia’.

Her 2011 film Tomboy was written and shot in a matter of months. Sciamma wrote the script in three weeks, completed casting in three weeks, and shot the film in 20 days. It premiered at the 61st Berlin International Film Festival in the Panorama section of the festival, and won the Teddy award for films with queer topics. The film was shown in French schools as part of an educational program.

Sciamma worked on TV series Les Revenants (2012) for a year and a half. She has said in interviews that she wants to direct serial television series.

Her 2014 film Girlhood was selected to be screened as part of the Directors' Fortnight section of the 2014 Cannes Film Festival. It also played at the 2014 Toronto International Film Festival and the 2015 Sundance Film Festival. In interviews, Sciamma said that Girlhood would be her last coming-of-age film and that she considered it, Water Lilies and Tomboy a trilogy.

Girlhood, a coming-of-age film about a young woman who leaves school and joins a gang, received criticism for centering Black experiences and featuring a mostly Black cast but being directed and made by a mostly white crew.

In between directing her own films, Sciamma continues to work as a screenwriter for other directors. She was sought after by André Téchiné, whose work Sciamma admired as a youth, to co-write the screenplay for his 2016 film Being 17. She also adapted the novel Ma Vie de Courgette (My Life as a Courgette) into a screenplay for a stop-motion animated film.

Sciamma's fourth feature film, Portrait of a Lady on Fire, began shooting in autumn 2018. It premiered In Competition at the 2019 Cannes Film Festival, where it won the Queer Palm and Best Screenplay.

She co-wrote the 2021 film Paris, 13th District alongside Jacques Audiard and Léa Mysius.

Sciamma then shot her fifth feature, Petite Maman, in the fall of 2020 and it premiered at the Berlin Film Festival in March 2021. It also screened at the 2021 San Sebastián International Film Festival, where it won the Audience Award.

Other roles
Since 2015 and  Sciamma continues to serve as the co-president of the SRF (Society of Film Directors).

Style and themes
Sciamma frequently collaborates with Para One, who has scored all her films and directed scripts by Sciamma in the past. She frequently collaborates with cinematographer Crystel Fournier, who worked on Sciamma's Girlhood trilogy, among others.

She is noted for casting non-professional actors in her films, and also frequently casts  Adèle Haenel, who appeared in Water Lilies, Pauline, and Portrait of a Lady on Fire.

Sciamma has said that fashion and style form an important part of characterisation, which is why, though uncredited, she is often the costume designer for her films.

Sciamma has cited David Lynch as a heavy influence, along with seeing Virginia Woolf as "the greatest novelist" and Chantal Akerman as "one of the most important filmmakers".

Sciamma has spoken about the metaphorical purpose of using synchronized swimming in Water Lillies, which she claims "reveals a lot about the job of being a girl," due to the tension between athleticism and feminine aesthetics.

A common theme in Sciamma's films is the fluidity of gender and sexual identity among girls and women. Her films look at lesbianism and queerness, and how this represented on screen. She focuses on the idea of the body, and how touch is related to it within cinema. Sciamma’s notable in her thematic elements for female gaze, and many scholars have cited her as a pioneer for creating a new way of seeing women in media. She also likes to conceptualise the idea of ‘looking’, using Russian nesting dolls as a metaphor of "looking within looking".

Sciamma also regularly examines themes of family including broken families, bereavement, and adoption (Wilson). By focusing on coming-of-age narratives, she examines autonomy of children and teenagers, especially in terms of gender and sexuality. Her films often capture children without their parents, and documents their metamorphosis and imagination onscreen. She is interested in their subjugation and autonomy.

Sciamma does not believe in the idea of a muse for her pieces, and despite her personal relationship with Haenel, says that the relationships on screen are of collaboration and subversion, not fascination.

Sciamma focuses on identity and representation in film, such as black identity in Girlhood, and motherhood identity in Petite Maman.

Activism

Sciamma is a feminist. She was a founding member of the French branch of the 50/50 by 2020 movement, a group of French film industry professionals advocating for gender parity in film by the year 2020.

She has contributed heavily to discourse with cinema regarding the female gaze. Sciamma uses her platform to speak about the restrictions of the male gaze and present movies that elevate the female gaze. She sees her work, particularly Portrait of a Lady on Fire, as a manifesto of the female gaze. Sciamma stated in an interview: "That’s why the male gaze is obsessed with representing lesbians, for instance. It's a way to control it. Our stories are powerful because they are dangerous. We are dangerous. So it's a very good strategy to despise us — to undermine us — because it's giving us less leverage for a very powerful political dynamic".

Sciamma has stated that "cinema is always political," and that creating films by women and about women is a political act.

In 2018, she co-organised and participated in the women's protest against inequality at the 2018 Cannes Film Festival alongside many notable women in film, including Agnès Varda, Ava DuVernay, Cate Blanchett and Léa Seydoux. This protest campaigned for gender equality in the film industry.

At the premiere of her film Portrait of a Lady on Fire at the 2019 Cannes Film Festival, both Sciamma and lead actress Haenel wore 50/50 pins in support of the movement.

In 2020 Sciamma and the Portrait of a Lady on Fire team joined Haenel in walking out of the 45th César Awards after Roman Polanski won the award for Best Director. Haenel had previously spoken out about experiencing sexual harassment from director Christopher Ruggia. Sciamma stated in an interview regarding the walk-out that “...there was no plan. It’s all about the moment, a matter of seconds. It’s about moving your legs, as simple as that. And that’s hard. It’s hard to stand up, hard to move your legs. I understand why people don’t. But sometimes you have to.”

Personal life
Sciamma is a lesbian. In 2014, Adèle Haenel publicly acknowledged that she was in a relationship with Sciamma in her acceptance speech for her César Award. The two had met on the set of the 2007 film Water Lilies and started dating sometime after. The couple parted ways, amicably, sometime before the 2018 filming of Portrait of a Lady on Fire, which also starred Haenel.

Filmography and awards

See also
 List of female film and television directors
 List of lesbian filmmakers
 List of LGBT-related films directed by women

References

Further reading
 
Belot, Sophie. “Céline Sciamma's La Naissance des pieuvres (2007): Seduction and be-coming”. Studies in French Cinema, 2012, 12:2, 169-184, DOI: 10.1386/sfc.12.2.169_1
Bramowitz, Julie. “Céline Sciamma's Newest Film, Girlhood, Changes the Face of the Coming-of-Age Story.” Vogue. Vogue, January 30, 2015. https://www.vogue.com/article/girlhood-movie-celine-sciamma-changes-coming-of-age-story.

Bulloch, Ellie. Subverting the ‘Male Gaze’: How Is a ‘Female Gaze’ Evident in the Works of Sophie Calle and Céline Sciamma? Dissertation, Professor Paul Hegarty, 2021. https://www.nottingham.ac.uk/clas/documents/final-year-prizes/2021/ellie-bulloch-dissertation.pdf.

External links

 
 Céline Sciamma at France Culture
 

1978 births
Living people
European Film Award for Best Screenwriter winners
French feminists
French film directors
French people of Italian descent
French screenwriters
French women film directors
French women screenwriters
French lesbian artists
Lesbian feminists
LGBT film directors
LGBT feminists
French LGBT screenwriters
French lesbian writers
People from Pontoise
Cannes Film Festival Award for Best Screenplay winners
21st-century French LGBT people
21st-century French screenwriters
21st-century French women writers